The Howe Covered Bridge is a historic covered bridge carrying Belknap Brook Road across the White River in Tunbridge, Vermont, just east of Vermont Route 110.  Built in 1879, it is one of five surviving bridges in the town, one of the highest concentrations of covered bridges in the state.  It was listed on the National Register of Historic Places in 1974.

Description and history
The Howe Covered Bridge is located in southern Tunbridge, just east of Vermont 110 on Belknap Brook Road. It is a single-span multiple Kingpost truss structure, resting on dry laid stone abutments. The abutments are extended upriver by concrete wingwalls. The trusses are formed of timbers bolted together, with vertical iron rods providing additional stability. The exterior is finished in vertical board siding, and is topped by a gabled metal roof. The portal ends are also finished in vertical board siding, which extends partway along the inside to shelter the truss ends.

The bridge was built about 1879; its builder is unknown.  It is one of five surviving bridges in Tunbridge, which, along with another in nearby Chelsea, form a remarkable concentration of 19th-century covered bridges in the state.

See also
National Register of Historic Places listings in Orange County, Vermont
List of Vermont covered bridges
List of bridges on the National Register of Historic Places in Vermont

References

External links

Covered bridges on the National Register of Historic Places in Vermont
National Register of Historic Places in Orange County, Vermont
Bridges completed in 1879
Covered bridges in Orange County, Vermont
Buildings and structures in Tunbridge, Vermont
Road bridges on the National Register of Historic Places in Vermont
Wooden bridges in Vermont
King post truss bridges in the United States
1879 establishments in Vermont